John Wilson (born 1972) is a British conductor, arranger and musicologist, who conducts orchestras and operas, as well as big band jazz. He is the creator of the John Wilson Orchestra and Associate Guest Conductor of the BBC Scottish Symphony Orchestra.

Education
Wilson was born in Gateshead, Tyne & Wear. He attended Breckenbeds Junior High School in Low Fell, then Heathfield Senior High School in Gateshead (now closed). In the late 1980s he studied music at A-level at Newcastle College, where he conducted a variety of ensembles including a 96-piece orchestra and choir for a concert version of West Side Story. He wrote and directed his own pantomime during this period and he also conducted for many local amateur dramatic societies. Later he attended the Royal College of Music, first as a percussionist, and later studying composition and conducting. During this time he won the institution's Tagore Gold Medal for outstanding academic excellence.

Career
In 2004 Wilson was appointed the music director for the Hollywood feature film Beyond the Sea, a biopic of the life of Bobby Darin starring Kevin Spacey. In 2007 he conducted the BBC Concert Orchestra in a BBC Proms concert of British film music, followed in 2009 by conducting his own orchestra (the John Wilson Orchestra) in their Proms debut, a celebration of MGM Musicals, and made a further appearance in the 2010 Proms celebrating Rodgers & Hammerstein. He made a further Proms appearance in the 2011 season, entitled "Hooray for Hollywood", featuring his orchestra with the Maida Vale Singers and soloists. In 2012 he and his orchestra gave another two performances at the BBC Proms. The first was a complete reconstruction of My Fair Lady which was broadcast on radio, the second was a tribute to the composers and arrangers of "The Broadway Sound" shown on BBC Two. The John Wilson Orchestra appeared in every Proms season from 2009 to 2019, with a semi-staged version of Rodgers & Hammerstein's Oklahoma! being the 2017 Prom.

In recent years, Wilson has focused on conducting orchestras and operas, beginning the latter with a series of performances of Ruddigore for Opera North in early 2010. He has conducted the London Symphony Orchestra, notably for the UK premiere of Mark-Anthony Turnage's Håkan, a concerto for trumpet and orchestra. He has also conducted the Philharmonia Orchestra, the Royal Liverpool Philharmonic Orchestra, the Swedish Radio Symphony Orchestra, the Glyndebourne Touring Opera, Sydney Symphony Orchestra, CBSO, and regularly conducts BBC Philharmonic Orchestra. In July 2017, he made his debut with the Royal Concertgebouw Orchestra in Amsterdam, performing a programme of works by Leonard Bernstein and appeared at the Proms conducting the BBCSSO in his role of Associate Guest Conductor.

He held the position of Principal Conductor of the RTÉ Concert Orchestra from 1 January 2014, until December 2016. Wilson took up the position of Associate Guest Conductor of the BBC Scottish Symphony Orchestra in September 2016.

Wilson has made numerous recordings, both with his own orchestra and as guest conductor, including an ongoing series of discs of music by Aaron Copland, with the BBC Philharmonic, for Chandos Records.

In 2018, John Wilson reformed the Sinfonia of London to undertake a series of recordings, beginning with a recording of Korngold's Symphony in F Sharp for Chandos Records.

He is a patron of The British Art Music Series along with James MacMillan and Libby Purves.

Wilson is also an arranger and orchestrator and has produced a number of orchestrations for film, radio and television. In 2000 he orchestrated Sir Richard Rodney Bennett's incidental music for a BBC production of Gormenghast. This scoring won the Ivor Novello Award for Best Film Score. Wilson orchestrated and conducted Howard Goodall's score for the 2002 BBC film The Gathering Storm about the life of Winston Churchill.

Wilson's interest in historical film scores has led to his restoring a number of classic film scores and he is currently reconstructing the orchestrations of all the major MGM musicals, especially those by Conrad Salinger. Many of the original film scores were destroyed by MGM in 1969, and left only the short scores or piano scores, which Wilson used as a guide when reconstructing. He described in an interview that "transcribing music from the soundtrack is an incredibly laborious process and sometimes it's very, very slow going. The cyclone sequence from The Wizard of Oz took forever. I remember spending a whole Sunday doing three or four seconds' worth of music, so complex is that scene, with notes flying all over the page!"

Discography
 John Wilson, BBC Concert Orchestra: Eric Coates, Under The Stars (17 Orchestral Miniatures), ASV Digital 1997
 John Wilson, BBC Concert Orchestra: Eric Coates, The Enchanted Garden (10 Orchestral Pieces), ASV Digital 1998
 John Wilson, Royal Ballet Sinfonia: The Land of the Mountain and the Flood: Scottish Orchestral Music, ASV Digital 1999
 John Wilson, John Wilson Orchestra: Orchestral Jazz, featuring Richard Rodney Bennett, Vocalion 2000
 John Wilson, John Wilson Orchestra: Soft Lights & Sweet Music: Classic Angela Morley Arrangements, Vocalion 2001
 John Wilson, John Wilson Orchestra: Shall We Dance? The Big Band Arrangements of Geraldo, Vocalion 2002
 John Wilson, John Wilson Orchestra: Moonlight Becomes You: The Classic Arrangements of Paul Weston, Vocalion 2003
 John Wilson, John Wilson Orchestra: Beyond The Sea – Original Motion Picture Soundtrack, Rhino Entertainment Company, 2004
 John Wilson, John Wilson Orchestra, Gary Williams: Alone Together, Vocalion 2004
 John Wilson, John Wilson Orchestra: The Film and Television Music of Angela Morley, Vocalion 2004
 John Wilson, John Wilson Orchestra, Lance Ellington: Lessons in Love, Vocalion 2005
 John Wilson, BBC Concert Orchestra: Edward German, Symphony No 1, et al, Dutton Epoch 2005
 John Wilson, John Wilson Orchestra: Dance Date, Vocalion 2005
 John Wilson, BBC Concert Orchestra: Anthony Collins, Vanity Fair, Dutton Epoch 2006
 John Wilson, BBC Concert Orchestra: Robert Farnon, Captain Horatio Hornblower RN Suite, et al, Dutton Epoch 2006
 John Wilson, BBC Concert Orchestra: Edward German, Symphony No 2, Dutton Epoch 2007
 John Wilson, Royal Liverpool Philharmonic Orchestra: Eric Coates, London Again, Avie Records 2008
 John Wilson, BBC Concert Orchestra: Eric Coates, Sound & Vision (w/ Sir Thomas Allen, Richard Edgar-Wilson), Dutton Epoch 2008
 John Wilson, Hallé Orchestra: John Ireland, The Overlanders Suite et al, Hallé Concerts Society 2009
 John Wilson, BBC Concert Orchestra: John Ireland, Orchestral Songs & Miniatures (w/ Roderick Williams), Dutton Epoch 2010
 John Wilson, BBC Concert Orchestra: Ralph Vaughan Williams, Heroic Elegy & Triumphal Epilogue; Alwyn, Bowen & Parry, Dutton Epoch 2010
 John Wilson, Royal Liverpool Philharmonic Orchestra: Made in Britain, Avie Records 2011
 John Wilson, Royal Liverpool Philharmonic Orchestra: John Ireland, Piano Concerto: Legend, First Rhapsody et al, Naxos 2011
 John Wilson, BBC Concert Orchestra: Edward German, Coronation March & Hymn et al, Dutton Epoch 2011
 John Wilson, John Wilson Orchestra: That's Entertainment: A Celebration of the MGM Film Musical, EMI Classics 2011
 John Wilson, BBC Concert Orchestra: Elgar, The Longed for Light (Elgar's Music in Wartime), Somm 2012
 John Wilson, John Wilson Orchestra: Rodgers & Hammerstein At The Movies, EMI Classics 2012
 John Wilson, John Wilson Orchestra: At The Movies: The Bonus Tracks, Warner Classics 2013
 John Wilson, John Wilson Orchestra: Track on Re-Joyce, The Best of Joyce DiDonato (Rodgers, You'll Never Walk Alone), Erato 2013
 John Wilson, John Wilson Orchestra: Track on Classical 2013 (Richard Rodgers, The King & I Overture), Erato 2013
 John Wilson, John Wilson Orchestra: Cole Porter in Hollywood, Warner Classics 2014
 John Wilson, Philharmonia Orchestra: Elgar, The Spirit of England w/ Judith Howarth, Simon Callow, Somm 2014
 John Wilson, John Wilson Orchestra: Gershwin in Hollywood: Live at the Royal Albert Hall, Warner Classics 2016
 John Wilson, BBC Philharmonic Orchestra: Copland, Orchestral Works Vol 1 – Ballet, Chandos 2016
 John Wilson, BBC Philharmonic Orchestra: Copland, Orchestral Works Vol 2 – Symphonies, Chandos 2016
 John Wilson, Ensemble: Walton, Façade (Carole Boyd, Zeb Soames), Orchid Classics 2017
 John Wilson, BBC Scottish Symphony Orchestra: Tracks on Siècle – Leonard Elschenbroich (Debussy, Dutilleux), Onyx 2017
 John Wilson, BBC Scottish Symphony Orchestra: Sir Richard Rodney Bennett: Orchestra Works, Vol 1, Chandos 2017
 John Wilson, BBC Philharmonic Orchestra: Copland, Orchestra Works Vol 3 - Symphonies, Chandos 2018
 John Wilson, Sinfonia of London: Korngold, Works for Orchestra - Symphonies, Chandos 2019
 John Wilson, Sinfonia of London: Escales, French Orchestral Works - Symphonies, Chandos 2020
 John Wilson, Sinfonia of London: Respighi : Roman Tone Poems, Chandos 2020
 John Wilson, Sinfonia of London: English Music for Strings (Britten, Bliss, Bridge, Berkeley) Chandos 2021
 John Wilson, Sinfonia of London: Dutilleux: Le Loup, Sonatine pour flute, Sonate pour hautbois, Sarabande et Cortege. Chandos 2021
 John Wilson, Sinfonia of London: Ravel, Ma Mere l'oye, Bolero, Alborada del Gracioso, Pavane, Valses nobles et sentimentales, La Valse, Chandos 2022
 John Wilson, Sinfonia of London: Strauss, Korngold & Schreker: Music for Strings, Chandos 2022
 John Wilson, Sinfonia of London: John Ireland: Orchestral Music, Chandos 2022
 John Wilson, Sinfonia of London: Hollywood Soundstage, Chandos 2022

References

External links
John Wilson's website
John Wilson's page on the Intermusica website.
John Wilson Orchestra, Wilson's Orchestra.

1972 births
Living people
Alumni of the Royal College of Music
British conductors (music)
British male conductors (music)
British jazz bandleaders
British music arrangers
British male jazz musicians
People from Gateshead
Musicians from Tyne and Wear